FMT, or fmt, may refer to:

 Fecal microbiota transplant
 Finite model theory
 Fluorescent microthermography
 FMT, the Amtrak code for Fremont station, California, US
 FMT, the National Rail code for Falmouth Town railway station, Cornwall, UK
 fmt (Unix), a text formatter
 Forsvarets Materieltjeneste, the Danish Defence Material Service, now the Danish Defence Acquisition and Logistics Organization
 Free Malaysia Today, a Malaysian online newspaper

See also